Legacy is a live album from Planetshakers, recorded live at Planetshakers 20th Anniversary Conference in Melbourne, Australia and its sister conferences in Manila, Philippines and Kuala Lumpur, Malaysia in 2017. Planetshakers Ministries International and Integrity Music released the album on 15 September 2017. They worked with Joth Hunt in the production of this album.

Critical reception

Signaling in a four star review for Louder Than the Music, Jono Davies states, "This is like worship music that's had more than a few energy drinks. Even if you are not in the mood for high energy worship music, still put this on, this album and its tracks are infectious."

Track listing

Chart performance

Legado
Planetshakers has also recorded a Spanish version of Legacy called Legado.

Personnel
Adapted from AllMusic.

References

2017 live albums
Planetshakers albums